The Port of Bissau, also known as Porto Pidjiguiti, is the chief port of Guinea-Bissau. Located on Geba River, it serves the capital of Bissau. It has two piers and a jetty. The port's Pidjiguiti docks were the site of the Pidjiguiti massacre on 3 August 1959. A light on Bissau Cathedral is maintained by the harbourmaster.

Description

The port is situated on Geba River. It has crane facilities for up to 50 tonnes. The cargo port has two piers, a southwest pier and, a newer one on the northeast. However, the present draft is said to be . Bissau Cathedral tower houses a light which guides ships through the Geba River estuary to the Port of Bissau. The light is maintained by the Capitania dos Portos, Serviços de Marinha.

History
The port has major significance to the history and economic development of the nation. Given the importance of the port to the national economy, and the previously poor facilities of the port, a great deal of investment occurred in the 2010s. This facilitated the growth of the mining industry in the country, with the exportation of bauxite. Plans to develop the port to support the shipping of bauxite go back to at least 1983, when a $47.4 million project was announced.
 
The port's Pidjiguiti docks were the site of the Pidjiguiti massacre, which took place on 3 August 1959, when police shot the dockworkers, killing 50 and wounding over 100 people. The stevedores were on their first strike, organized by the African Party for the Independence of Guinea and Cape Verde (Partido Africano da Independência da Guiné e Cabo Verde, PAIGC), marking the beginning of strong resistance against the Portuguese colonial authority. A large, black, fist monument commemorates the massacre. Several older buildings remain around the port area, including the 18th century military barracks and old prison.

Port operation 
The Bissau port was designed to handle 5,000 containers a year, yet it serves nearly five times as many today. A consequence of its overstretched capacity is the high costs related to its operation. 

Source: World Bank ; African Development Bank study on the transport sector in Guinea-Bissau

References

External links

Bissau
Ports and harbours in Africa
Ports and harbours of the Atlantic Ocean
Transport in Guinea-Bissau